Fruitvale is an unincorporated community in Kern County, California.

Fruitvale was founded in 1891.

References

Unincorporated communities in Kern County, California
Populated places established in 1891
1891 establishments in California
Unincorporated communities in California